, also erroneously called , was a Japanese professional baseball player and actor. Hashimoto played baseball for Mainichi Orions in the 1950s. He was forced to retire in 1958 following an injury, and then joined Daiei Studios. As an actor, he is known for his roles as Daimajin in the 1966 film trilogy and as Hiroshi Suzuki in the 1972 Bruce Lee film, Fist of Fury.

Partial filmography 

San'nin no kaoyaku (1960)
Sutekina yaro (1960)
Ginza no dora-neko (1960)
Ginzakko monogatari (1961)
Tsuma wa kokuhaku suru (1961)
Ken ni kakeru (1962)
Jigoku no shikyaku (1962)
Yoru no haitô (1963) - Blue collar guy
Kyojin Ôkuma Shigenobu (1963)
Kuro no kirifuda (1964)
Fight, Zatoichi, Fight (1964) - Inozo
Mushuku mono (1964) - Bishamon (uncredited)
Nemuri Kyôshirô: Mashôken (1965)
Fukushû no kiba (1965) - Kurayami's henchman
Kumo o yobu kôdôkan (1965)
Daimajin (1966) - Daimajin (uncredited)
Daimajin ikaru (1966) - Shunpei Ikenaga / Daimajin
Gontakure (1966) - Port superintendent
Wrath of Daimajin (1966) - Daimajin
A Certain Killer (1967)
Gamera vs. Viras (1968) - Doctor A
Kaidan otoshiana (1968) - Udegawa
Zoku hiroku onna ro (1968) - The Inspector
Yokai Monsters: Spook Warfare (1968) - Daimon
Shin Yotarô senki (1969) - Private FIrst Class Hashimoto
Yakuza Zessyō (1970) - Toyama
Mona Riza okyo (1971)
Zatoichi and the One-Armed Swordsman (1971) - Samurai
Fist of Fury (1972) - Hiroshi Suzuki
Shin heitai yakuza: Kasen (1972)
Twinkle, Twinkle, Lucky Stars (1986) - Japanese Fighter (final film role)

References

External links 
 Chikara Hashimoto at Baseball-Reference.com.
 Riki Hashimoto at IMDb.

1933 births
2017 deaths
20th-century Japanese male actors
Japanese baseball players
Mainichi Orions players
Baseball people from Hokkaido